The , or  for short, is the monopoly electric company of Hokkaidō, Japan. It is also known as Dōden and HEPCO. The company is traded on the Tokyo Stock Exchange (first section), Osaka Securities Exchange (first section), and Sapporo Securities Exchange.

According to the company profile, during fiscal 2011 (i.e. 1 April 2010 to 31 March 2011), 26% of the electricity generated was from nuclear, 31% from coal, 15% from hydro, 8% from oil and 2% from 'new energy' sources.

Hokkaido only has one nuclear power station, the Tomari Nuclear Power Plant.

Facilities
Nuclear
Tomari (:ja:泊発電所)（2,070 MW）
Coal
Tomato-atsuma Thermal Power Station (:ja:苫東厚真発電所)（1,650 MW）
Naie (奈井江発電所)（350 MW）
Sunagawa (砂川発電所)（250 MW）
Geothermal energy
Mori (:ja:森発電所)（2.5 MW）
Hydro electric – 53 dams including the following:
 Kyogoku pumped storage project (600 MW)
Hoheikyo, Ishikari River (50 MW)
Kamiiwamatsu, Tokachi River (30.4 MW)
Niikappu, Niikappu River（200 MW）
Nokanan, Ishikari River (30 MW)
Okuniikappu, Niikappu River (44 MW)
Shizunai, Shizunai River (48 MW)
Takami, Shizunai River（200 MW）
Takisato, Ishikari River (57 MW)
Tokachi, Tokachi River (40 MW)
Tomura, Tokachi River (40 MW)
Uryu, Ishikari River (51 MW)
Oil
Date (伊達発電所)（700 MW）
Shiriuchi (知内発電所)（700 MW）
Tomakomai (苫小牧発電所)（250 MW）
Diesel
Onbetsu (音別発電所)（280 MW）

Others;
Wind farms – 3 facilities（1.58 MW）
Solar (photovoltaic) energy – 9 facilities（146 kW）

Generating capacity by source

References 
Sources

This article incorporates material from 北海道電力 ("Hokkaido Electric Power") in the Japanese Wikipedia, retrieved on September 29, 2007.

External links 

Hokkaido Electric Power Co., Inc. (in English)
HEPCO Sustainability Report 2008 (in English)

Nuclear power companies of Japan
Electric power companies of Japan
Companies based in Sapporo
Japanese companies established in 1951
Energy companies established in 1951